M.J.K. Smith captained the English cricket team in Australia in 1965–66, playing as England in the 1965-66 Ashes series against the Australians and as the MCC in their other matches on the tour. The 5-Tests series ended in 1–1 draw. Although they failed to reclaim the Ashes this was not unexpected as the Australian press labelled them the weakest MCC team to arrive in Australia and the bookmakers were giving odds of 7/2 on their winning the series. These views rapidly changed as they set about winning their state matches with exciting, aggressive cricket and by the First Test the odds against them had been reduced to evens. Lindsay Hassett said "other teams from England may have been better technically but none had tried so hard to make the game as interesting as possible". Financially the tour's receipts were much lower than in 1962–63 due to the number of rain-affected games in a wet Australian summer and the general doldrums of the sixties.

In October, the team played two matches in Colombo during a stopover on the voyage to Australia. After leaving Australia in February, they played a three-match Test series in New Zealand and finally two matches in Hong Kong on the way home.

The manager
They had made no promised on arrival about 'brighter cricket' – that tiresome phase – but they had aimed to play better cricket, and by and large events had shown that taking the initiative brought the best results. Everyone knew who was behind this philosophy; it was Doug Insole, chairman of the selectors, and, of course, Billy Griffith, the tour manager.
E.W. Swanton
Billy Griffith was an amateur wicket-keeper for Cambridge University and Sussex and the first secretary of the MCC to have been a Test player. He had been a glider pilot for the 6th Airborne Division during the Second World War, fighting at D-Day and Arnhem and winning the Distinguished Flying Cross. He became Secretary of Sussex after the war (as well as captain in the 1946 season) and was the player-manager and reserve wicket-keeper on the tour of the West Indies in 1947–48. When used as a makeshift opener on his Test debut he made 140 in six hours and later played two Tests in South Africa, the only wicket-keeper to be used between 1946 and 1959 when the great Godfrey Evans was available. The decline of amateur cricket in English county cricket and the increasing professionalism of the game led to dull, lifeless cricket as teams were determined to avoid defeat and viewed games as a job rather than entertainment (ironically the keenest cricketer on the tour was Geoff Boycott, a noted stonewaller). There had been a surge in gate receipts after the war, but this fell rapidly in the 1960s as other forms of entertainment became available to the public. Griffith had become Secretary in 1962 and oversaw the official merging of amateur and professional for the 1963 season, which prevented him from managing the MCC tour of Australia in 1962–63, except for one month when he flew out to relieve the Duke of Norfolk. Aware of M.J.K. Smith's natural caution the MCC gave Griffith extraordinary powers granting him overall control of cricket on the tour. Fortunately, he did not resort to these as he preferred more diplomatic means, but he urged attacking cricket in the tour games, notably against Western Australia. Normally the MCC manager took care of the players and social side of the tour, as there were many functions to attend. The Assistant-Manager was Jack Ikin who had toured Australia in 1946–47, who oversaw the tour finances, collecting gate money on behalf of the MCC, booking hotels and making the travel arrangements.

The captain
...he strolled in with an open-necked shirt, a white linen jacket which appeared to have been slept in for a week and a carry-cot containing a slumbering junior member of the Smith dynasty. Apparently Mrs Smith had gone shopping and M.J.K. was left holding the baby. Despite an Oxford education his accent was utterly classless and between questions to which he appeared to be paying no attention whatever, he applied himself to solving the crossword in the latest Times to arrive from Britain. "Good heavens", growled one of Australia's senior cricket correspondents, "what have we here?" What we all had on that tour was the affable companionship of one of the most popular England captains ever to tour anywhere. It never occurred to him to leave the baby, let alone his wife, at home while he led the fight for the Ashes.
Ian Wooldridge

Michael John Knight Smith, better known as M.J.K. Smith or Mike Smith, is remembered as one of England's most popular cricket captains and England's last double international, in cricket and rugby. He was captain of Oxford University (1956), Warwickshire (1957–67) and England (1963–66) and unlike Len Hutton, Peter May or Ted Dexter rode '...the side with a loose rein, believing it knew where it was going and need only an occasional tug to keep it on the right course. I think most players appreciated this and his openness as a person brought a better response on the field.' He thought that any bowler good enough to play for England knew what field suited him best and generally let his men play in their own style, though this resulted in slow over rates as he did not chivvy them along. Even the truculent fast bowler John Snow '...thought he was very astute in his handling of players...' and recalled '...Mike Smith adding a few words of congratulations in his thoroughly open, absent-minded-professor sort of way'. E.W. Swanton reported that 'Smith, though outwardly unconventional and in manner casual to a degree, succeeds as a captain for the conventional reasons. He is thoughtful for his players, unselfish, does not 'fuss' them or panic, shows a grasp of the situation which they deem in general sensible and not least gives an inspiring personal lead in the field'.

Despite wearing spectacles Smith was heavy run-maker in County cricket and passed 2,000 runs a season each year from 1957 to 1962, including 3,245 runs (57.94) in 1959. Fred Trueman thought "there is probably nobody in the world who plays the off-spinner better", but Smith's fragility against fast bowling meant that he could not hold down a regular place in the Test team. It was not his only failing as 'Mike is widely remembered...as a very unreliable runner between the wickets. Warwickshire tales of woe in this respect are numerous and I can remember a call between them in 1964 going something like "No A.C." – Yes, Mike" – Wait A.C." – "Damn it, Mike" – "Sorry A.C." He was, however, a mantis-like close fielder who took a record 593 catches for Warwickshire and 53 catches in 50 Tests for England. His outwardly nonchalant captaincy hid a good cricketing brain and he took a rebuilt Warwickshire side to third, fourth and second place in the County Championship in 1962–64.

Smith was known as a good tourist and was made captain of the England tour of India in 1963–64 when Ted Dexter and Colin Cowdrey were unavailable and without England's top bowlers Brian Statham and Fred Trueman. He lost the toss five times in a row and had so many injuries and illnesses that in the Second Test at Madras Smith had to use three batsmen, two wicket-keepers and six bowlers. When Mickey Stewart was unable to play after the first day because of dysentery he seriously considered calling up the cricket journalist Henry Blofeld, but managed to survive with just 10 men. Smith became the first England captain to draw all fives Tests in a series (it was the third time India had done this) and was considered to have done well to avoid defeat. It was his best series with 306 runs (51.00) and when Ted Dexter retired after losing 1–0 to Bobby Simpson's Australia in 1964 Smith was made captain for England's last tour of South Africa before the Basil d'Oliveira Crisis. He won 1–0 against the talented Springboks, the last captain to defeat them in a Test series until 1996–97. He beat a weak New Zealand 3–0 and lost 1–0 to South Africa at home in 1965, but was appointed captain for the MCC tour of Australia in 1965-66 with Cowdrey as vice-captain, despite support for the Kent captain at Lord's. He drew with both Australia (1–1) and New Zealand (0–0) and after losing the First Test against the West Indies in 1966 by an innings he was replaced by Cowdrey and retired at the end of the following season. Smith returned to Warwickshire in 1970 and did well enough to be recalled against Australia in 1972 before finally retiring in 1975.

Batting
<blockquote>
England always had enough runs in the bank – this was the only MCC tour to Australia wherein seven men had an average over 40. True, the captain's was only 17. Yet in contrast to events nine years later no one agitated for his removal.
E.W. Swanton
</blockquote>

Unlike the previous three tours England arrived in Australia with some capable opening batsmen, Bob Barber, Geoff Boycott and John Edrich. Barber had been a simple push and run player for Lancashire before transferring to M.J.K. Smith's Warwickshire in 1963 and flowered into the most attacking opener in England. He was an excellent foil to Boycott's pedestrian run-making and they were the best opening pair England had had in years. Barber's 185 in five hours in the Third Test at Sydney – adding 234 for the first wicket with Boycott (84) – was one of E.W. Swanton's most treasured moments. Like his captain the young Boycott still wore steel-rimmed spectacles and lacked the certainty of his later years with contact lenses, but E.W. Swanton clearly remembers his 'burning ardour for the game in an age wherein even cricket is tainted with 'work to rule'.' The Fifth Test saw the worst of him, as he scored slowly, hogged the strike and ran out Bob Barber. In 1965 John Edrich had a First Class run of 139, 121 not out, 205 not out, 55, 96, 188, 92, 105 and 310 not out, the last innings against New Zealand in the Third Test at Headingley, where he hit 52 fours and 5 sixes, but M.J.K. Smith declared before he could overtake Gary Sobers record 365. In the following Test he was hit on the head by a Peter Pollock bouncer and thereafter was a tenacious left-hander who made solid rather than stylish innings.p172, Swanton, 1986 Eric Russell was a graceful Scottish opener whose career was limited by the dominance of Boycott and Edrich. He was injured in the only Test he played on the tour, where he came in last and held out for 10 minutes in an unbeaten duck.

Ken Barrington had made 582 runs (72.75) in the 1962-63 Ashes series and 531 runs (75.85) in 1964 – "batting with bulldog determination and awesome concentration". His 256 at Old Trafford remains England's highest post-war century against Australia and his Test batting average of 58.67 is easily the highest of any English batsman since Len Hutton. Ian Chappell wrote with feeling "Every so often you encounter a player whose bat seem about a yard wide. It's not, of course. It just seems that way. England's Ken Barrington was one, our own Bill Lawry another. Gee, they were hard to dislodge". In 1965 he had been controversially dropped from the England team for taking over seven hours to make 137 against a weak New Zealand attack, but when quick runs were needed in the Fifth Test at Melbourne he surprised everyone by smashing a hundred off 122 balls and bringing up the century with a six into the stands. Colin Cowdrey was the most experienced England batsmen – this was the fourth of his six tours in Australia – and was a classic strokemaker whose perfect timing was a great asset on hard Australian wickets. He was accused of overly careful batting on the tour, but like Barrington hit out in the Fifth Test. Peter Parfitt was a pleasing young Middlesex batsman who had toured in 1962–63, but who never really succeeded against Australia and did not play in any of the Tests. The captain M.J.K. Smith enjoyed playing against the state and country sides, but was the only batsmen who failed to cash in on a weak Australian attack and never passed 50 in the Tests.

John Murray and Jim Parks were both decent wicket-keeper-batsmen, and Parks played in all five Tests due to his superior batting, hitting 3 sixes and 4 fours in his 52 in the First Test. Barry Knight was a big-hitting all rounder who enjoyed thumping county sides and weak Test attacks like India and New Zealand, but struggled against Australia. Fred Titmus had proved to be a real find in 1962–63, and improved upon his reputation, making three 50s in the series and averaging 64.50 even though he batted a number 9. He took guard outside the leg-stump, giving the bowler a clean view of the wicket, but moved over quickly and batted solidly. David Allen was another spinning all-rounder and made an unbeaten 50 in the Tests, but otherwise failed.

Bowling
Of MCC's cluster of fastish bowlers Brown was laid low with bursitis, or a sort of house-maid's knee of the elbow, David Larter, that tall, pleasant if somewhat remote young man who enjoys the unique distinction of having toured Australia twice with the MCC without being chosen for a Test Match, could only bowl half-pace because of a strained side, while Ken Higgs, faithful trier if ever there was one but who looked a little plain on Australian pitches, had picked up a chill...so the England fast attack consisted perforce of Jones and Knight, the latter until a few weeks previously having been vegetating quietly down in Essex. Thank goodness Boycott was fit again, it was seriously said, as his bowling might well be useful!
E.W. Swanton

The retirement of England's great new-ball partnership of Fred Trueman and Brian Statham left a yawning gap in the England attack. The fast bowler John Snow would take 31 wickets (22.83) in the 1970–71 Ashes series, but he was not chosen for the tour and went to South Africa to play club cricket. Brown was 6'4" tall and was noted for his steep bounce and was regarded as England's best new ball bowler, his 5/63 forced Australia to follow on in the Third Test at Sydney. The Scottish seamer David Larter was even taller at 6' 7" and had a ridiculously long run, but he lacked self-confidence, and an ankle injury on the tour ended his career. Jeff Jones was a Welsh left-arm bowler of genuine pace and the father of Simon Jones he took 6/118 in the Fourth Test, but troubled the umpires by running on the pitch in a state game and consequently missed the First Test.  He produced one or two hostile spells in the series and took important wickets. Ken Higgs revived his career in 1965 as Brian Statham's new ball partner for Lancashire and took 4/47 and 4/96 against the powerful South African batting at the Oval in 1965. Due to stomach cramps he was not used much in Australia, but took 17 wickets (9.23) in New Zealand, then 24 wickets (25.45) back home against the West Indies. With England's bowlers laid low, the all-rounder Barry Knight was called up. A veteran of the 1962–63 Ashes series, he liked to drop the ball short, but lacked the pace to worry the Australians. Even so, he took 4/84 in the Second Test when the hosts were out for 358 on a flat wicket. Geoff Boycott was a useful medium-paced bowler in his youth, known to wear his cap backwards as he bowled, and was used as the third new ball bowler in the Third and Fourth Tests. David Allen and Fred Titmus returned after their successful tour in 1962–63, but were only useful on the famous spinning wicket at Sydney, taking 4/47 and 4/40 in the second innings of England's victory. Elsewhere they were expensive and could only be used for containment. Ken Barrington had started life as a leg-spinner and was a good bowler at club level, as was Bob Barber, and commentators thought they should have been used more widely considering England's poor attack, but Smith only tried them when a draw was a foregone conclusion.

Fielding
England rarely matched Australia in the sharpness of their fielding, but this was regarded as the best fielding team England has sent in many years, and they "moved in the field like flannelled dervishes". John Murray was an old friend of Fred Titmus and kept wicket to him for Middlesex. He was recognised as the best glovesman in England, but was kept out of the Test team because he was not as good a batsman as his rivals. Jim Parks was the son of the all-rounder Jim Parks and father of the wicketkeeper Bobby Parks. A veteran who had been kept out of the England team by Godfrey Evans Parks was a fair batsman, but missed a vital stumping off Peter Burge that cost England a chance of winning the Second Test. In the slips there was Colin Cowdrey, who would take a record 120 Test match catches, M.J.K. Smith was a noted close fielder who rarely missed a chance and Ken Barrington took 58 catches for England. Peter Parfitt was regarded as one of the best first slips in England, but did not play in the Tests. Fred Titmus was a famous chatterbox with a habit of taking catches in mid-conversation, which worried Smith. Geoff Boycott began as a sluggish outfielder, but worked on his game until he could throw the ball in with accuracy from the boundary.

Touring team

First Test – Brisbane

See Main Article – 1965–66 Ashes series

Second Test – Melbourne

See Main Article – 1965–66 Ashes series

Third Test – Sydney

See Main Article – 1965–66 Ashes series

Fourth Test – Adelaide

See Main Article – 1965–66 Ashes series

Fifth Test – Melbourne

See Main Article – 1965–66 Ashes series

External sources
 Cricket Archive

Annual reviews
 Playfair Cricket Annual 1967
 Wisden Cricketers' Almanack 1967

Further reading
 Geoffrey Boycott, Boycott: The Autobiography, Pan Books, 2006
 Colin Cowdrey, M. C. C. The Autobiography of a Cricketer, Coronet Books, 1977
 Bill Frindall, The Wisden Book of Test Cricket 1877–1978, Wisden, 1979
 Chris Harte, A History of Australian Cricket, Andre Deutsch, 1993
 Ken Kelly and David Lemmon, Cricket Reflections: Five Decades of Cricket Photographs, Heinemann, 1985
 Mark Peel, The Last Roman: A Biography of Colin Cowdrey, Andre Deutsch Ltd, 1999
 Ray Robinson, On Top Down Under, Cassell, 1975
 E.W. Swanton(ed), The Barclays World of Cricket, Collins, 1986

References
 Peter Arnold, The Illustrated Encyclopaedia of World of Cricket, W.H. Smith, 1985
 Ashley Brown, A Pictorial History of Cricket, Bison Books Ltd, 1988
 David Gower, Heroes and Contemporaries, Granada Publishing Ltd, 1985
 Tom Graveney and Norman Miller, The Ten Greatest Test Teams, Sidgewick and Jackson, 1988
 John Snow, Cricket Rebel: An Autobiography, Littlehampton Book Services Ltd, 1976
 E.W. Swanton, Swanton in Australia with MCC 1946–1975'', Fontana, 1977

1965 in English cricket
1965 in Australian cricket
1966 in English cricket
1966 in Australian cricket
1965 in Ceylon
Australian cricket seasons from 1945–46 to 1969–70
International cricket competitions from 1960–61 to 1970
1965-66
1965
Sri Lankan cricket seasons from 1880–81 to 1971–72
1965-66